Terry Paul Bevington (born July 7, 1956) is a former manager who managed the Chicago White Sox of Major League Baseball from 1995 until 1997.

Early life
Bevington was born in Akron, Ohio. His family moved to Santa Monica, California where he was a standout high school baseball player at Santa Monica High. He spent seven seasons in the minor leagues after being drafted by the New York Yankees in 1974. He batted .247 in 368 games played, including 33 with the Triple-A Vancouver Canadians of the Pacific Coast League in 1980.

Managerial career
In the middle of the 1995 season, he was named manager of the White Sox when Gene Lamont was fired on June 2. 
He went 57–56 to close out the season (as a whole, the White Sox finished 75–76) and he was retained for the next season. Most notably during the year, he engaged in a fight with Milwaukee Brewers manager Phil Garner (as an attempt to protect Ozzie Guillen from Jeff Cirillo turned into putting Garner in a headlock) on July 22 that saw each get suspended for four games.  He never particularly gelled with the players, coaches or the media, with one reporter later describing him as an "obfuscator". The White Sox attempted to replace him with Jim Leyland in 1997, but he instead managed with the Florida Marlins, which resulted in Chicago having to keep Bevington. Despite having players such as Frank Thomas and later Albert Belle, the White Sox failed to reach the postseason in his tenure (in contrast, Lamont had led them to the playoffs once in 1993). 

One notable gaffe occurred in September 1997 that involved him signaling for a reliever to come into a game only to realize he had forgotten to warm them up in the first place, which resulted in sending in a reliever with no throws that had to deliver an intentional walk to get a reliever warmed up in the bullpen. After  seasons at the helm, he was fired on September 30, 1997 with a record of 222–214 (.509). He was replaced by Jerry Manuel. When attending the jersey retirement ceremony for Thomas in 2010, he received boos from the Chicago crowd.

He was a third base coach for the Toronto Blue Jays from  through  before returning to the minor leagues as a manager. He resigned as the Edmonton Cracker-Cats' skipper after a suspension stemming from an on-field brawl between the Cracker Cats and Calgary Vipers.

Managerial record

References

External links

1956 births
Living people
Baseball players from Akron, Ohio
American expatriate baseball players in Canada
Chicago White Sox coaches
Chicago White Sox managers
Major League Baseball first base coaches
Major League Baseball third base coaches
Northern League (baseball, 1993–2010) managers
Toronto Blue Jays coaches
Holyoke Millers players
Fort Lauderdale Yankees players
Vancouver Canadians players
Oneonta Yankees players
Burlington Bees players
Johnson City Yankees players
Syracuse Chiefs managers